Rolland Douglas Todd (born April 26, 1934) is a former player and coach in the National Basketball Association, and a former player in the American Basketball League, who also coached basketball at University of Nevada, Las Vegas (UNLV).  He was the first coach of the then-expansion Portland Trail Blazers, leading the team to a 29–53 record in its inaugural season (best of the three expansion clubs who entered the NBA that year); though was let go the next season when the team failed to improve. According to Sports Illustrated his nickname while coaching the Blazers was "Mod Todd".

Early life
Todd grew up in Strathmore, California, the oldest of four children.  He attended Fresno State College where he “was a star 6-4 guard at Fresno State in the mid-1950s, leading the Bulldogs to a 19-8 record and the California Collegiate Athletic Association championship as a senior in 1957-58.” His roommate and teammate for three years was Jerry Tarkanian.  He attended graduate school at the University of Washington.

After graduating from Fresno State, Todd played for the Seattle, Washington based Buchan Bakers of the National Industrial Basketball League (NIBL) from 1958 to 1960. He briefly joined the Akron Goodyear Wingfoots in 1960 during their unsuccessful attempt to qualify as the team to represent the United States during the 1960 Summer Olympics.

Todd signed with the St. Louis Hawks of the National Basketball Association (NBA) in June 1960, but was placed on waivers before the start of the regular season. Todd reportedly signed with the Washington Tapers of the American Basketball League (ABL) in October 1961, but never joined the team and took a teaching job in Seattle, Washington. In December 1961, Todd signed with the San Francisco Saints of the ABL. On October 26, 1962, Todd signed with the Oakland Oaks of the ABL.

Career statistics

|-
| align="left" | 1960–61
| align="left" | San Francisco Saints
|| 53 || — || 25.1 || .380 || .256 || .752 || 4.1 || 3.7 || — || — || 8.2 
|-
| align="left" | 1961–62
| align="left" | Oakland Oaks
|| 24 || — || 30.5 || .409 || .292 || .837 || 5.6 || 3.1 || — || — || 14.4 
|- class="sortbottom"
| style="text-align:center;" colspan="2"| Career
| 77 || — || 26.8 || .392 || .270 || .787 || 4.5 || 3.5 || — || — || 10.1

Source:

References

External links
 Todd Coaching, LLC website

1934 births
Living people
Akron Goodyear Wingfoots players
American men's basketball players
Basketball coaches from California
Cal State Los Angeles Golden Eagles men's basketball coaches
College of the Sequoias alumni
Fresno State Bulldogs men's basketball players
Junior college men's basketball coaches in the United States
Junior college men's basketball players in the United States
Portland Trail Blazers head coaches
San Francisco Saints players
Sportspeople from Tulare County, California
UC Riverside Highlanders men's basketball coaches
UNLV Runnin' Rebels basketball coaches
University of Washington alumni